
Gmina Czempiń is an urban-rural gmina (administrative district) in Kościan County, Greater Poland Voivodeship, in west-central Poland.

The gmina contains part of the protected area called Chłapowski Landscape Park.

Villages
Apart from the town of Czempiń, Gmina Czempiń contains the villages and settlements of Betkowo, Bieczyny, Borowo, Donatowo, Głuchowo, Gorzyce, Gorzyczki, Helenopol, Jarogniewice, Jasień, Maruszkowo, Nowe Borówko, Nowe Tarnowo, Nowy Gołębin, Piechanin, Piotrkowice, Piotrowo Drugie, Piotrowo Pierwsze, Rakówka, Roszkowo, Sierniki, Słonin, Srocko Wielkie, Stare Tarnowo, Stary Gołębin and Zadory.

Neighbouring gminas
Gmina Czempiń is bordered by the gminas of Brodnica, Kościan, Krzywiń, Mosina, Śrem and Stęszew.

References

Polish official population figures 2006

Czempin
Kościan County